Jake Lloyd-Jones is an Australian television producer. He is best known for his documentary films on contemporary issues such as "Which Way is China" on the Chinese underground music scene, or "An Occupied Country" about Coal Seam Gas Mining in Australia. He was also responsible for conceiving and staging Sydney's notorious community-driven annual art event the Sydney Body Art Ride

Filmography

Television 
 The Chaser's War on Everything: Series 1, 2 & 3 – Senior Researcher / Producer (2006–2009)
 The New Inventors: Producer (2010–2011)
 Catalyst: Researcher (2010)
 The 7.30 Report: Archival Producer (1995–2005)

Documentary 
 Lost Negatives - Featured in The Guardian newspaper 
 Chaktomuk - Four stories from Phnom Penh 2018 produced in collaboration with the Women’s Network for Unity
 Powderfinger: The Final Odyssey with Myf Warhurst 2010
 Unrequited Art 2011 
 THE WIKILEAKS TAPES
 The Elizabeth Street Gallery Project (1&2) 2012, 2014 
 Himalayan Sisters: Reflexions sur un voyage 2013 
 The Beowulf Project 2014 
 An Occupied Country 2015 
 Just Let it Happen 2015 
 Which Way is China 2016

Short film 
 Under the sun (2014)
 Faces in the Street (2011) A modern interpretation of the famous Henry Lawson poem

Photography 
Exhibitions at City of Sydney's Pine St Gallery and the Marrickville StirrUp Gallery
Photograph of Pling purchased for inclusion and promotion of the National Portrait Gallery (Australia) 2020 Pub Rock exhibition

Television Awards 
The Chaser's War on Everything (ABC) 
AFI Award 2006 – Best Television Comedy – Winner (Producers: Mark FitzGerald, Julian Morrow, Andy Nehl)
AFI Award 2007 – Best Television Comedy – Nomination (Producers: Andy Nehl, Julian Morrow, Jo Wathen)
Logie Award 2008 – Most Outstanding Comedy Program – Nomination

References

Australian television directors
Australian documentary filmmakers
Australian music video directors
People from Sydney
Australian television producers
Australian conceptual artists
Living people
Year of birth missing (living people)